This is a list of  Time Team  episodes from series 19. The series was released on DVD (region 2) in 2014.

Episode

Series 19

Episode # refers to the air date order. The Time Team Specials are aired in between regular episodes, but are omitted from this list. Regular contributors on Time Team include: presenters Tony Robinson, Mary-Ann Ochota; archaeologists Mick Aston, Phil Harding, Helen Geake, Raksha Dave, Matt Williams, Alex Langlands, Tracey Smith, Cassie Newland; Jackie McKinley (osteoarchaeologist); Victor Ambrus (illustrator); John Gater (geophysicist); Paul Blinkhorn (pottery expert).

References

External links
Channel 4 Time Team episode features for series 19 including dig-reports and summaries by the archaeologists.
Time Team at Channel4.com
The Unofficial Time Team site Fan site

Time Team (Series 19)
2012 British television seasons